Kampung Awah is a small village in mukim Bukit Segumpal, Pahang, Malaysia. This village is located about 18 kilometres from Temerloh town and 35 kilometres from Maran town.

It also a birthplace of the renowned Malaysian singer, Dato' Sri Siti Nurhaliza.

See also
 Pahang

References

Villages in Pahang
Populated places in Pahang